The First United Methodist Church of Nebraska City, Nebraska was organized in 1854. Previously, Reverend W. D. Gage had Methodist services in the area. The church's main hall is named after Rev. Gage. The land was bought in 1855 and the one-room church was built the same year. Since then, several expansions have made the church larger with several conference rooms, Gage Hall, and the main sanctuary. The building is currently the oldest Methodist church in the state of Nebraska.

External links
 FUMC Nebraska City

Churches in Nebraska City, Nebraska
United Methodist churches in Nebraska
1854 establishments in Nebraska Territory